Active Slovenia (Aktivna Slovenija) was a political party in Slovenia. The party was founded in 2004 and won 3.0% of the popular vote and no seats in the National Assembly at the parliamentary election in 2004.

Foundation
The party was formed as the result of a split in the Youth Party of Slovenia in the run up to the 2004 European election. Supporters of Active Slovenia described the decision making in the Youth Party of Slovenia as undemocratic.

A congress was held on the 8 May 2004 in Novo Mesto to form the party and elected Franci Kek as the first party leader.  The party had one member of the Slovenian National Assembly on the founding of the party, Igor Štemberger, but lost this seat in the 2004 Slovenian parliamentary elections.

Merge with Zares
In 2007, the party merged with the social-liberal political party Zares, founded the same year by a split in the Liberal Democracy of Slovenia.

2004 establishments in Slovenia
2007 disestablishments in Slovenia
Defunct political parties in Slovenia
Liberal parties in Slovenia
Organizations based in Ljubljana
Political history of Slovenia
Political parties disestablished in 2007
Political parties established in 2004